The Dutch hybrid elm cultivar Ulmus × hollandica 'Groeneveld' was cloned in 1949 at the De Dorschkamp Institute, Wageningen,  and released in 1963 in response to the earlier, less virulent form of Dutch elm disease that afflicted Europe shortly after the First World War. The cultivar was derived from a crossing of Dutch clones '49', (originally believed to be an English Wych Elm Ulmus glabra but later identified as another example of Ulmus × hollandica) and '1', a Field Elm Ulmus minor found in central France and marketed by the Barbier nursery in Orléans.

Description

The tree is slow growing, and produces a dense, upswept growth which initially made it popular as a street tree in the Netherlands. The dark-green obovate leaves are < 9 cm long by 4 cm broad, arranged in clusters on short branchlets.

Pests and diseases
'Groeneveld' has good resistance to Coral-spot fungus Nectria cinnabarina, and Black Spot .
However, like all the other Dutch hybrids released before 1989, it proved to have only marginal resistance, rated 3 out of 5  to the later, virulent form of Dutch elm disease and consequently planting is no longer recommended where the disease is prevalent.

Cultivation
'Groeneveld' was also introduced elsewhere in Europe, including Britain, in small numbers. The tree was briefly propagated and marketed in the UK by the Hillier & Sons nursery, Winchester, Hampshire from 1975 to 1977, during which time 29 were sold. The tree was planted in trials  in Canberra, Australia started in 1988, but has not shown promise in that environment so far; it has however proved popular in New Zealand. There are several specimens in American arboreta (see under Accessions).

Notable trees
The TROBI Champion tree in the UK is at Stanmer Park, near Brighton, East Sussex, measuring 18 m high by 53 cm d.b.h. in 2002

Etymology
'Groeneveld' translates as 'green field', and was named for the eponymous de Dorschkamp trial site at Wageningen.

Hybrid cultivars
FL 522: derived from a crossing with the Chinese species Ulmus chenmoui by the Istituto per la Protezione delle Piante in Florence; it has not been released to commerce.

Accessions

North America
Holden Arboretum, US. Acc. no. 70–127
Morton Arboretum, US. Acc. no. 76–72, 29–2007 (graft).

Europe
Brighton & Hove City Council, UK. NCCPG Elm Collection , UK champion: Stanmer Park, 18 m high, 53 cm d.b.h. in 2002.
Grange Farm Arboretum , Sutton St. James, Spalding, Lincs., UK. Acc. no. 830.
Royal Botanic Garden Wakehurst Place, UK. Acc. no. 1975–6125
Sir Harold Hillier Gardens, Romsey, UK. Acc. no. 1977.6442
Wijdemeren City Council Netherlands. Elm Arboretum; Zuidsingel circa 1985 and Strandje Wijde Blik 2019 Kortenhoef; ‘s-Gravelandsevaartweg, Loosdrecht: ten trees planted 2018. 9 trees planted 2018 Nedervecht, Nederhorst den Berg.

Nurseries

Europe
Bellwood Trees, Meigle, Perthshire, Scotland, UK. 
De Reebock , Zwalm, Belgium.
Noordplant , Glimmen, Netherlands.
Westerveld Boomkwekerij , Opheusden, Netherlands.

Oceania

References

External links
 Sheet labelled 'Baarn, trial elm no.296', 1962 = 'Groeneveld' (Heybroek)
 Samarae specimen. Sheet labelled 'Baarn, trial elm no.296', 1962
 

Dutch elm cultivar
Ulmus articles with images
Ulmus